Societé minière de Bakwanga (abbreviated MIBA) is a diamond mining company based in the Democratic Republic of the Congo.  MIBA operate near Mbuji Mayi, in Kasai-Oriental Province in south central DRC.

Approximately 80% of MIBA's stock is owned by the Congolese government, with 20% owned by former Umicore subsidiary Sibeka, which in turn is owned by Mwana Africa plc, which operates the mines. The MIBA employees went on strike several times for not being paid for approximately 2 years. The majority of the population in Congo believe that the company's money is being embezzled by the head of the Congolese government Joseph Kabila and his collaborators. This is the reason why employees suffer and haven't been paid for two years.

History

Société minière du Bécéka (1919–1961)

The company that is now known as MIBA was originally formed as the Société minière du Bécéka (Mibeka), in 1919 under Belgian rule, with the specific purpose of exploiting the mineral riches in the area of Mbuji-Mayi.

In the 1950s, it was estimated that the city, then known as Bakwanga, and its surrounding area had the world's most important deposit of diamonds, with at least 300 million karats.

Societé Minière de Bakwanga (1961–present)
In 1962 Mibeka created the Societé Minière de Bakwanga (MIBA) as a subsidiary. This was during the Congo Crisis when the DRC established its independence from Belgium. Mibeka transferred all of its exploitation rights and Congolese assets to MIBA while relocating all of its Belgian assets to Belgium.

Independence from Belgium did not necessarily slow the extraction of diamonds, but it did seriously affect MIBA's dominance of the region's diamond trade. In 1959, the year before Congolese independence, MIBA reportedly produced 14.1 million karats of diamonds, and in 1961 set a record production rate with 18 million karats of diamonds. But by 1963, the numbers had fallen dramatically in the wake of years of turmoil, including an attempt to establish the region as the independent Mining State of South Kasai. In that year, the company produced just 1.4 million karats of diamonds, almost all of them industrial diamonds. By contrast, between 4 million and 6 million karats of diamonds were produced by diamond smugglers who had previously been tightly controlled by the Belgian colonial administrators, to the benefit of the company's Belgian management.

The company's profits were also commandeered by the South Kasai government of rebel leader Albert Kalonji. In 1961, those profits were estimated to be $12 million.

Despite the smuggling and regional turmoil, the company was extremely dominant in the world's diamond trade. In 1963, MIBA produced 80 percent of the world's industrial diamonds and 57 percent of all diamonds.

An 800 square kilometer diamond mining area just south of Mbuji-Mayi was transferred from MIBA to the joint venture . After a failed bid to float the Oryx company on the Alternative Investment Market by selling to Petra Diamonds in June 2000, Sengamines claimed it had sold off equity in the company, 49% to the Cayman Islands-based Oryx Natural Resources, controlled by Omani businessman Thamer Bin Said Ahmed Al-Shanfari, 35% for COMEX Congo, and 16% for MIBA. However, no buyout actually occurred, and the ultimate beneficiary of Oryx's stake was the Zimbabwe Defence Forces, through its subsidiary Operation Sovereign Legitimacy (OSLEG). Rather than a commercial sale, the transfer was a means for Laurent Kabila to help finance Zimbabwe's military interventions in the DRC. MIBA took back control of the Sengamines area in August of 2005.

In 2003, Emaxon Finance International, a company owned by Dan Gertler, provided MIBA $15 million in financing in exchange for 88% of MIBA's diamond production. This deal was criticized by a 2005 Congolese parliamentary commission headed by Christophe Lutundula who recommended the contract be renegotiated.

In 2020, the government of the DRC voted to remove MIBA's governing board and restructure the company, after a May 2020 audit found significant irregularities. In August of 2020, at the behest of the Félix Tshisekedi administration, the state miner Gécamines gave MIBA $5 million to revamp operations.

External links and reference
Societé minière de Bakwanga @ Mwana Africa plc

References

Diamond mining companies of the Democratic Republic of the Congo
Kasaï-Oriental
Mbuji-Mayi